HAT-P-24b is an extrasolar planet discovered by the HATNet Project in 2010 orbiting the F8 dwarf star HAT-P-24. It is a hot Jupiter, with a mass three quarters that of Jupiter and a radius 20% larger.

The study in 2012, utilizing a Rossiter–McLaughlin effect, have determined the planetary orbit is probably aligned with the equatorial plane of the star, misalignment equal to 20°.

References

External links
 http://www.astro.keele.ac.uk/jkt/tepcat/planets/HAT-P-24.html
 http://exoplanet.eu/star.php?st=HAT-P-24
 http://www.odyssespace.fr/exoplanetes-liste.php

Exoplanets discovered by HATNet
Exoplanets discovered in 2010
Transiting exoplanets
Giant planets
Hot Jupiters
Gemini (constellation)